, born on September 20, 1965 in Tokyo, Japan,  is a Japanese manga artist, who is well known for his manga Jiraishin. As of March 2006, he is currently married and has one child. His alias is Ichigo Nekota.

History
He began his involvement in the manga work with the creation of Jiraishin, published and serialized in Afternoon magazine and published in Kodansha, which made him a popular icon in Japan from 1992-1999. In late 1999, he published a single manga volume called ALIVE, published by Shueisha. Shortly afterwards, he published Tetsuwan Girl, which is also carried by Kodansha as well.

Takahashi was a guest lecturer at Ritsumeikan University back in 1998, giving a talk on "Expression". Many of the students and teachers have said that he is well liked and popular due to his sense of humor and his looks. His former assistant was Tsutomu Nihei, who went to create the manga BLAME!. Takahashi's travels to the United States, New York City in particular, enabled him to create scenes in Jiraishin that had English conversations. His travels also influenced him to make Kyoya, Eriko and other Jiraishin characters speak fluent English.

Takahashi provided the cover art for Galneryus' 2017 album Ultimate Sacrifice.

Works

Manga
69
ALIVE
Angel's Share
Bakuon Rettou
Black-Box
Blue Heaven
Dead Flowers - His first manga under the alias of Ichigo Nekota
Hito Hitori Futari
Ice Blade (Jiraishin)
NeuN
ROUTE69
SIDOOH
Skyhigh
Skyhigh Karma
Tetsuwan Girl
Zankyо̄

Anime
Gad Guard - In-Between Animator.

Music
Ultimate Sacrifice by Galneryus - album cover

References

External links

1965 births
Living people
People from Tokyo
Manga artists from Tokyo
Winner of Kodansha Manga Award (General)